BS8 may refer to:
 BS8, a BS postcode area for Bristol, England
 BS 8 Specification for Tubular Tramway Poles, a British Standard
 Bonomi BS.8 Biancone, a glider